Wanda L. James is the first African American woman to own a marijuana dispensary in the United States. In 2022, James was elected to represent district 1 on the  University of Colorado Board of Regents.

Life
James is married to Scott Durrah, a former United States Marine. He is a certified chef.

Education
In 1986, James graduated from the University of Colorado. After graduation she was commissioned into the United States Navy. She also graduated from the Inaugural Class of the Los Angeles African American Women's Public Policy Institute at the University of Southern California.

Career
James was a former lieutenant in the United States Navy, where some of her duties included tracking submarines. She also was a political campaign manager. She ran Colorado representative Jared Polis's first campaign, and ran the 2006 congressional race in Colorado Springs, Colorado for Lieutenant Colonel Jay Fawcett. She worked on former President Barack Obama's 2008 National Finance Committee. She also worked to get sentences dropped for people in jail for cannabis possession.  She worked on Colorado governor John Hickenlooper's task force for Colorado's Amendment 64. She was previously appointed to the Los Angeles Small and Local Business Commission. She has also served on the board of directors of the Starlight Children's Foundation and the Greater Los Angeles African American Chamber of Commerce. She decided to get into the cannabis industry after her brother was given a 10-year prison sentence for marijuana possession. Prior to opening a dispensary, she owned restaurants with her husband in Los Angeles and Denver.  When she opened a dispensary in 2009 with her husband, she became the first black dispensary owner in the United States. The business was closed in 2012, but reopened in 2016. She is a managing partner at the Cannabis Global Initiative.

Honors and appearances
James has appeared on the covers of the inaugural edition of the April 2016 issue of Sensi Magazine, the January 2018 issue of Dispensary Magazine and the February 1997 issue of Black Enterprise. In 2018, James was named one of the 100 Most Influential People in the cannabis industry by High Times Magazine, in 2015 she was named One of the TOP 50 Female Executives by the publication Cannabis Business Executive (CBE), and in 2010 James was named the Marijuana Advocate of the Year by Westword Magazine. She has appeared on numerous television shows, including The Daily Show with Jon Stewart, CBS Sunday Morning, CNBC's Marijuana USA, and Smile Jamaica.

References

Year of birth missing (living people)
Living people
American cannabis activists
Cannabis in Colorado
University of Southern California alumni
University of Colorado alumni
Female United States Navy officers
Colorado Democrats
African-American women in politics
21st-century American politicians
21st-century American women politicians
21st-century African-American women
21st-century African-American politicians